Óðins nöfn is an anonymous skaldic poem, one of the þulur found in a section called Viðbótarþulur in Skáldskaparmál in Snorri Sturluson's Prose Edda.

It lists the names of Odin.

External links
The poem at Skaldic Poetry of the Scandinavian Middle Ages project.
Two versions of the poem in Old Norse.

Skaldic poems